Allurjapyx is a genus of diplurans in the family Japygidae.

Species
 Allurjapyx aethiopicus Silvestri, 1930
 Allurjapyx leleupi (Pagés, 1952)

References

Diplura